Gadebusch is an Amt in the district of Nordwestmecklenburg, in Mecklenburg-Vorpommern, Germany. The seat of the Amt is in Gadebusch.

The Amt Gadebusch consists of the following municipalities:
Dragun
Gadebusch
Kneese 
Krembz 
Mühlen Eichsen 
Roggendorf 
Rögnitz 
Veelböken

Ämter in Mecklenburg-Western Pomerania